"" ("When the Lord Christ sat at the table") is a Christian hymn related to the Passion of Jesus. The 28 stanza text was written by Nikolaus Herman and first published in 1560. Later Johann Sebastian Bach composed the four-part setting, BWV 285.

History 
Herman wrote "" as a text in 28 stanzas of six lines each, reflecting the Passion of Jesus. The hymn opens referring to the Last Supper, and continues with the appeal to always remember the death and bitter suffering ("Tod und bitter Leiden"). The hymnologist Philipp Wackernagel notes in his Bibliography on the history of German hymns of the 16th century, from 1855, that the hymn appeared in a Wittenberg hymnal by Nikolaus Herman from 1560,  (The Sundays' Gospels through the year in songs written for the children and Christian fathers). It came with the header "" ("The Passion / of our LORD Jesus / Christ, to the melody, Kompt her zu mir ...).

While the first publication mentioned two melodies to which the words could be sung ("" and ""), the melody associated with the text today appeared first in Görlitz in 1611. The hymn is contained with this melody in the hymnal by Gottfried Vopelius on page 140. Johann Hermann Schein composed a choral setting as part of his  in 1627. Johann Sebastian Bach composed a four-part setting, BWV 285, which is without text. It was published as No. 196 in the collection of chorales by Johann Philipp Kirnberger und Carl Philipp Emanuel Bach. Bach's biographer Philipp Spitta counts the hymn tune as one of the few attributed to Bach. He reports that the four-part setting appeared in Balthasar Reimann's Hirschberg chorale book of 1747.

References

External links 
 Da der Herr Christ zu Tische sass (Chorale) (Johann Sebastian Bach) cpdl.org
 Johann Sebastian Bach / Da der Herr Christ zu Tische sass, chorale setting for 4 voices, BWV 285 (BC F34) AllMusic
 Ein Choralbuch für Johann Sebastian 2 / Passion klassik-heute.de

16th-century hymns in German
Lutheran hymns
Passion hymns